Senator Smalley may refer to:

David Allen Smalley (1809–1877), Vermont State Senate
Jason Smalley (born 1981), Oklahoma State Senate